"World on Fire" is the second track off Firewind's sixth studio album Days of Defiance, released on 25 October 2010. It was released on digital music platforms on 17 August 2010 in the U.S. and 23 August in Europe. It is the only Firewind single to only have one track.

Personnel
 Apollo Papathanasio – vocals
 Gus G. – guitars
 Babis Katsionis – keyboards
 Petros Christodoylidis – bass
 Michael Ehré – drums

Footnotes

Firewind songs
2010 singles
2010 songs
Century Media Records singles